The destruction of Warsaw was Nazi Germany's substantially effected razing of the city in late 1944, after the 1944 Warsaw Uprising of the Polish resistance. The uprising infuriated German leaders, who decided to destroy the city as retaliation.

The German razing of the city had long been planned. Warsaw had been selected for destruction and major reconstruction as part of the Nazis' planned Germanization of Central Europe, under the Nazi Generalplan Ost. However, by late 1944, with the war clearly lost, the Germans had abandoned their plans of colonizing the East. Thus, the destruction of Warsaw did not serve any military or colonial purpose; it was carried out solely as an act of reprisal.

German forces dedicated an unprecedented effort to razing the city, destroying 80–90% of Warsaw's buildings, including the vast majority of museums, art galleries, theaters, churches, parks, and historical buildings such as castles and palaces. They deliberately demolished, burned, or stole an immense part of Warsaw's cultural heritage. After the war, extensive work was put into rebuilding the city according to pre-war plans and historical documents.

Prewar plan of destruction

On June 20, 1939, while Adolf Hitler was visiting an architectural bureau in Würzburg am Main, he noticed a project of a future German town – Neue deutsche Stadt Warschau. According to the Pabst Plan, Warsaw was to be turned into a provincial German city of 130,000. Third Reich planners drafted precise drawings outlining a historic "Germanic" core where a select few landmarks would be saved such as the Royal Castle which would serve as Hitler's state residence. The Plan, which was composed of 15 drawings and a miniature architectural model, was named after German army architect Friedrich Pabst who refined the concept of destroying a nation's morale and culture by destroying its physical and architectural manifestations. The design of the actual new German city over the site of Warsaw was devised by Hubert Gross. The aftermath of the failure of the Warsaw Uprising presented an opportunity for Hitler to begin to realize his pre-war conception.

Warsaw Uprising's aftermath

Expulsion of civilians

The Warsaw Uprising was launched by the Polish Home Army on August 1, 1944, as part of Operation Tempest. In response, under orders from Heinrich Himmler, Warsaw was kept under ceaseless barrage by Nazi artillery and air power for sixty-three days and nights by Erich von dem Bach-Zelewski.

In 1944, a large transit camp (Durchgangslager) was constructed in Pruszków's Train Repair Shops (Zakłady Naprawcze Taboru Kolejowego) to house the evacuees expelled from Warsaw. The security police and the SS segregated the deportees and decided their fate. Approximately 650,000 people passed through the Pruszków camp in August, September, and October. Approximately 55,000 were sent to concentration camps, including 13,000 to Auschwitz. They included people from a variety of social classes, occupations, physical conditions, and ages. Evacuees ranged from infants only a few weeks old to the extremely elderly. In a few cases, these were also people of different ethnic backgrounds, including Jews living on "Aryan papers".

Looting and destruction of buildings 

After the remaining population had been expelled, the Germans began the destruction of the remnants of the city. Special groups of German combat engineers were dispatched throughout the city in order to burn (Brandkommandos) and demolish (Sprengkommandos) the remaining buildings. According to German plans, after the war Warsaw was to be turned into nothing more than a military transit station. 

By January 1945, between 85% and 90% of the buildings had been completely destroyed; this includes up to 10% as a result of the September 1939 campaign and following combat, up to 15% during the earlier Warsaw Ghetto Uprising, 25% during the Uprising, and 40% due to systematic German demolition of city after the uprising.

Material losses were estimated at 10,455 buildings, 923 historical buildings (94%), 25 churches, 14 libraries including the National Library, 81 primary schools, 64 high schools, the University of Warsaw, the Warsaw University of Technology, and most of the city's historical monuments. Almost a million inhabitants lost all of their possessions. The exact losses of private and public property, including pieces of art, other cultural artifacts and scientific artifacts, is unknown but must be considered substantial since Warsaw and her inhabitants were the richest and wealthiest Poles in pre-war Poland. In 2004, the President of Warsaw, Lech Kaczyński (later President of Poland), established a historical commission to estimate losses to public property alone that were inflicted on the city by German authorities. The commission estimated the losses to be at least $31.5 billion. Those estimates were later raised to $45 billion and in 2005, to $54.6 billion (all equated to 2004 dollars). The official estimates don't include immense losses of private property, which are of unknown value since almost all of the pre-war documents (such as insurance values of private collections) have also been destroyed, but are considered between double and triple the official estimates (which are based on documented losses only while for example, the National Library's list of pre-war property lost estimated to be 1% of its collection since Germans destroyed all archives too).

Burning of libraries 

During the German suppression of the Warsaw Uprising of 1944, around 70 to 80% of libraries were carefully burned by the Brandkommandos (burning detachments), whose mission was to burn Warsaw. In October 1944 the Załuski Library, the oldest public library in Poland and one of the oldest and most important libraries in Europe (established in 1747), was burned down. Out of about 400,000 printed items, maps and manuscripts, only some 1,800 manuscripts and 30,000 printed materials survived.

In the last phase of the Warsaw Uprising and after its collapse, in September and October 1944, the three major private libraries in Warsaw (Krasiński Library, Przeździecki Library and the Libraty of Zamoyski Family Entail), including collections of priceless value to Polish culture, ceased to exist.  Those libraries had already suffered in September 1939, when they were bombed and burned.

An important collection of books belonging to the Krasiński Library, created in 1844, was largely destroyed in 1944. The collection originally consisted of 250,000 items. During the Uprising, on September 5, 1944, the library's warehouses were shelled by German artillery and burned almost completely. Some of the books were preserved, thrown through windows by the library's staff. The surviving collection was later deliberately burned by the Germans in October 1944 after collapse of the Uprising. About 26,000 manuscripts, 2,500 incunables, 80,000 early printed books, 100,000 drawings and prints, 50,000 note and theater manuscripts, and a large collection of maps and atlases were lost. The Przeździecki Estate Library in 6 Foksal Street included 60,000 volumes and 500 manuscripts, a rich archive containing 800 parchment and paper documents, and a cartographic collection consisting of 350 maps, atlases and plans. In addition to 10,000 prints and drawings, there was an extensive art gallery (Portrait of Casimir Jagiellon from the 15th century, Portrait of John III Sobieski from the Schleissheim Palace, the House altar of Sophia Jagiellon, 1456), valuable collection of miniatures and decorative art: textiles, porcelain, faience, glass, gold objects, military, etc. It burned down on September 25, 1939 as a result of severe aerial bombardment by the Germans (incendiary bombing). The surviving items sheltered in the neighbouring tenement house at Szczygla Street were burned in October 1944. The last of above mentioned libraries, the Library  of the Zamoyski Family Entail, acquired collections of 70,000 works (97,000 volumes), more than 2,000 manuscripts, 624 parchment diplomas, several thousand manuscripts, a collection of engravings, coins and 315 maps and atlases. Library collections also gathered numerous collections of art: a rich collection of militaria, miniatures, porcelain, faience and glass, natural collections, research tools etc., gathered mostly during the existence of the Zamoyski Academy. In 1939, about 50,000 items (about 30%) were destroyed in bombing. On September 8, 1944, the Germans set fire to both the Zamoyski Palace (Blue Palace) and the library building.

The Central Military Library, containing 350,000 books on the history of Poland, was destroyed, including the Library of Polish Museum in Rapperswil deposited there for safekeeping. The collection of the Rapperswil Library was transported to Poland in 1927. The library and the museum were founded in Rapperswil, Switzerland, in 1870 as "a refuge for [Poland's] historic memorabilia dishonored and plundered in the [occupied Polish] homeland" and for the promotion of Polish interests. The greater part of library's collections, originally 20,000 engravings, 92,000 books and 27,000 manuscripts, were deliberately destroyed by the Germans in 1944.

Unlike earlier Nazi book burnings where specific books were deliberately targeted, the burning of those libraries was part of the general burning of a large part of the city of Warsaw. This resulted in the disappearance of many valuable old books and scrolls among about sixteen million volumes from National Library, museums and palaces burnt indiscriminately by Germans in Poland during World War II.

Scope of destruction

Gallery

Warsaw's rebuilding

Warsaw was rebuilt by the Polish people between the 1950s and 1970s. The Palace of Culture and Science (completed in 1955) was a "gift" from the Soviet Union. Some landmarks were reconstructed as late as the 1980s. While the Old Town has been thoroughly reconstructed, the New Town has been only partially restored to its former state.

See also

 Chronicles of Terror
 Destruction of Kalisz
 List of libraries damaged during World War II
 List of Polish cities damaged in World War II
 Nero Decree

References

Bibliography

External links

Collection of civilian testimonies about destruction of Warsaw
Capturing the Ruins of Warsaw

Demolition
 
Nazi war crimes during the Warsaw Uprising
Germany–Poland relations
Warsaw